The Peerage of France was a hereditary distinction within the French nobility which appeared in 1180 during the Middle Ages.

The prestigious title and position of Peer of France was held by the greatest, highest-ranking members of the French nobility. French peerage thus differed from British peerage (to whom the term "baronage", also employed as the title of the lowest noble rank, was applied in its generic sense), for the vast majority of French nobles, from baron to duke, were not peers. The title of Peer of France was an extraordinary honour granted only to a small number of dukes, counts, and princes of the Roman Catholic Church. It was analogous to the rank of Grandee of Spain in this respect.

The distinction was abolished in 1789 during the French Revolution, but it reappeared in 1814 at the time of the Bourbon Restoration, which followed the fall of the First French Empire, when the Chamber of Peers was given a constitutional function somewhat along British lines which lasted until the Revolution of 1848. On 10 October 1831, by a vote of 324 against 26 of the Chamber of Deputies, hereditary peerages were abolished, but peerages for the life of the holder continued to exist until the chamber and rank were definitively abolished in 1848.

Following the Seven Years' War shortly before the French Revolution, some Canadian titles in the peerage of France came under the control of the British crown. All but one of these have either become extinct, or fallen into abeyance as their holders remained loyal to the French crown. The Baron de Longueuil holds the only French title of nobility that still exists today, as continued under the monarchy of Canada.

The words  and 
The French word  is equivalent to the English "peerage".  The individual title,  in French and "peer" in English, derives from the Latin , "equal". 

The main uses of the word refer to two historical traditions in the French kingdom, before and after the First French Empire of Napoleon I. The word also exists to describe an institution in the Crusader states.

Some etymologists posit that the French (and English) word baron, taken from the Latin , also derives from the Latin .  Such a derivation would fit the early sense of "baron", as used for the whole peerage and not simply as a noble rank below the comital rank.

Under the Monarchy: feudal period and 

Medieval French kings conferred the dignity of a peerage on some of their pre-eminent vassals, both clerical and lay.  Some historians consider Louis VII (1137–1180) to have created the French system of peers.

A peerage was attached to a specific territorial jurisdiction, either an episcopal see for episcopal peerages or a fief for secular ones.

The original number of peers in the Middle Ages was twelve: 
 Archbishop-Duke of Reims, premier peer
 Bishop-Duke of Laon
 Bishop-Duke of Langres
 Bishop-Count of Beauvais
 Bishop-Count of Châlons
 Bishop-Count of Noyon
 Duke of Normandy
 Duke of Aquitaine, also called Duke of Guyenne
 Duke of Burgundy
 Count of Flanders
 Count of Champagne
 Count of Toulouse

According to Matthew Paris, the Duke of Normandy and Duke of Aquitaine ranked above the Duke of Burgundy. But since the first two were absorbed into the crown early in the recorded history of the peerage, the Duke of Burgundy has become the premier lay peer. In their heyday, the Dukes of Normandy were undoubtedly the mightiest vassals of the French crown.

The constitution of the peerage first became important in 1202, for the court that would try King John of England in his capacity as vassal of the French crown. Based on the principle of trial by peers, a court wishing to acquire jurisdiction over John had to include persons deemed to be of equal rank to him in his capacity as either Duke of Aquitaine or Normandy. None of the peers had been specified, but since John's trial required the presence of the peers of France, it can be said that the first two peerages identifiable in the documents would be the duchies of Aquitaine and Normandy.

In 1216, Erard of Brienne claimed the County of Champagne through the right of his wife, Philippa of Champagne. Again this required the peers of France, so the County of Champagne is also a peerage. Six of the other peers were identified in the charter — the archbishop of Reims, the bishops of Langres, Chalons, Beauvais and Noyon, and the Duke of Burgundy. The tenth peerage that could be identified in the documents is the County of Flanders, in 1224. In that year John de Nesle entered a complaint against Joan of Flanders; the countess responded that she could only be cited by a peer. The absence of the two remaining peers in the documents of this era can be explained thus: the bishop of Laon had only been recently elected at the time the other ecclesiastical peers were mentioned, in 1216, and probably not yet consecrated; the Count of Toulouse, on the other hand, is a heretic. Thus, though there had been differences in the dates of the identification of the twelve peers, they were probably instituted simultaneously and their identities were known to their contemporaries.

Parallels may also be seen with the mythical Knights of the Round Table under King Arthur. So popular was this notion that, for a long time, people thought that peerages had originated in the reign of Charlemagne, who was considered a model king and a shining example for knighthood and nobility.

The dozen  played a role in the royal  or consecration, during the liturgy of the coronation of the king, attested to as early as 1179, symbolically upholding his crown, and each original peer had a specific role, often with an attribute. Since the peers were never twelve during the coronation in early periods, due to the fact that most lay peerages were forfeited to or merged in the crown, delegates were chosen by the king, mainly from the princes of the blood. In later periods peers also held up by poles a baldaquin or cloth of honour over the king during much of the ceremony.

This paralleled the arch-offices attached to the electorates, the even more prestigious and powerful first college in the Holy Roman Empire, the other heir of Charlemagne's Frankish empire.

The twelve original peers were divided in two classes, six clerical peers hierarchically above the six lay peers, which were themselves divided in two, three dukes above three counts:
{| class="wikitable"
|-
! Rank
! Bishops
! Lay
|-
| width="10%" rowspan="3" align="center" | Dukes
| width="33%" align="center" | Reims, archbishop, premier peer, anoints and crowns the king
| width="33%" align="center" | Burgundy, premier lay peer, bears the crown and fastens the belt
|-
| width="33%" align="center" | Laon, bears the  containing the sacred ointment
| width="33%" align="center" | Normandy, holds the first square banner
|-
| width="33%" align="center" | Langres, the only one of the five bishops not in the Reims province, bears the sceptre
| width="33%" align="center" |Aquitaine also called Guyenne after its refounding, holds the second square banner
|-
| width="10%" rowspan="3" align="center" | Counts
| width="33%" align="center" | Beauvais, bears the royal mantle
| width="33%" align="center" | Toulouse, carries the spurs
|-
| width="33%" align="center" | Châlons, bears the royal ring
| width="33%" align="center" | Flanders, carries the sword
|-
| width="33%" align="center" | Noyon, bears the belt
| width="33%" align="center" | Champagne, holds the royal standard

In 1204 the Duchy of Normandy was absorbed by the French crown, and later in the 13th century two more of the lay peerages were absorbed by the crown (Toulouse 1271, Champagne 1284), so in 1297 three new peerages were created, the County of Artois, the County of Anjou and the Duchy of Brittany, to compensate for the three peerages that had disappeared.

Thus, beginning in 1297 the practice started of creating new peerages by letters patent, specifying the fief to which the peerage was attached, and the conditions under which the fief could be transmitted (e.g. only male heirs) for princes of the blood who held an apanage. By 1328 all apanagists would be peers.

The number of lay peerages increased over time from 7 in 1297 to 26 in 1400, 21 in 1505, and 24 in 1588. By 1789, there were 43, including five held by princes of the blood (Orléans, Condé, Bourbon, Enghien, and  Conti),  (who was the son of a legitimized prince, the Count of Toulouse, also a ), and 37 other lay peers, ranking from the Duchy of Uzès, created in 1572, to the Duchy of Aubigny, created in 1787.

One family could hold several peerages. The minimum age was 25. The majority of new peerages created up until the fifteenth century were for royal princes, while new peerages from the sixteenth century on were increasingly created for non royals. After 1569 no more countships were made into peers, and peerage was exclusively given to duchies. Occasionally the  refused to register the letters of patent conferring peerage on them.

This meant that judicial proceedings concerning the peers and their  were exclusively under the jurisdiction of the Court of Peers.

While many lay peerages became extinguished over time, as explained above, the ecclesiastical peerages, on the other hand, were perpetual, and only a seventh one was created before the French Revolution, taking precedence behind the six original ones, being created in 1690 for the Archbishop of Paris, after centuries as a mere suffraganage, styled as second  for he held the Duchy of Saint-Cloud.

The expression  was also sometimes used for groups of nobles within a French fief (e.g. the Prince-Bishop of Cambrai, who held the County of Cambrai, was the overlord of its twelve ). These "peers" did not benefit from the royal privileges listed above.

A fanatical defender of the privileges of the peers was the memoirist Louis de Rouvroy, Duke of Saint-Simon, who was neither very wealthy (by ducal standards), nor influential at court, but whose father had been made a peer. Louis XIV tried to promote the status in protocol of his legitimized bastards in various minor respects, and Saint-Simon devotes long chapters of his memoirs to his struggles against this.

Under the First Republic and the First Empire: the Revolutionary and Napoleonic period
The original peerage of the French realm, like other feudal titles of nobility, was abolished during the French Revolution, on the night of August 4, 1789, the Night of the Abolition of Feudalism.

Napoleon reinstituted French noble titles in 1808 but did not create a system of peerages comparable to the United Kingdom. He did create a House of Peers on his return from Elba in 1815, but the House was not constituted before his abdication at the end of the Hundred Days.

Chamber of Peers

The French peerage was recreated by the Charter of 1814 with the Bourbon Restoration, albeit on a different basis from before 1789. A new Chamber of Peers was created, similar to the model of the British House of Lords. The Chamber of Peers survived the July Revolution of 1830, with some revisions, as the July Monarchy's Charter of 1830 merely revised rather than overturned the Charter of 1814. Throughout both the Restoration and July Monarchy, the Chamber met in the Luxembourg Palace. However, the establishment of the French Second Republic in the Revolution of 1848 broke cleanly with the 1814 Charter and disbanded the Chamber of Peers definitively, establishing a unicameral National Assembly.

Peerage of Jerusalem
The Kingdom of Jerusalem, the only crusader state equal in rank to such European kingdoms as France (the origin of most of Jerusalem's knights) and England, had a peerage modelled on the French and using the French language.

Charlemagne's twelve peers
In the medieval French  and material associated with the Matter of France that tell of the exploits of Charlemagne and his knights—such as The Song of Roland—the elite of the imperial army and Charlemagne's closest advisors were called "The Twelve Peers". The exact names of the peers vary from text to text. The number of peers is thought to parallel the twelve apostles.

Coats of arms of the Twelve Peers

See also
 French nobility
 Dukes in France
 List of French peerages
 List of French peers
 List of coats of arms of French peers

Notes

References

Citations

Sources 

 Richard A. Jackson, "Peers of France and Princes of the Blood", French Historical Studies, volume 7, number 1 (Spring 1971), pp. 27–46.
 , edited and translated by Ian Short, Paris: , 1990, .

Bourbon Restoration
France
 
France